Henri Stoelen (2 September 1906 – 1977) was a Belgian water polo player who competed in the 1936 Summer Olympics.

He was part of the Belgian team which won the bronze medal. He played all seven matches.

See also
 List of Olympic medalists in water polo (men)

External links
 

1906 births
1977 deaths
Belgian male water polo players
Olympic bronze medalists for Belgium
Olympic water polo players of Belgium
Water polo players at the 1936 Summer Olympics
Olympic medalists in water polo
Medalists at the 1936 Summer Olympics
Sportspeople from Brussels
20th-century Belgian people